Montgomery Independent School District is a public school district based in Montgomery, Texas. The district's attendance zone includes the city of Montgomery and the surrounding unincorporated area of Montgomery County. For the 2018–2019 school year, the district received an A grade from the Texas Education Agency.

Schools
Montgomery High (Grades 9-12)
Lake Creek High School (Grades 9-12)
Montgomery Junior High (Grades 6-8)
Oak Hills Junior High (Grades 6-8)
Keenan Elementary (Grade K-5)
Lincoln Elementary School (Grade K-5)
Lone Star Elementary (Grades K-5)
Madeley Ranch Elementary (Grades K-5)
Montgomery Elementary (Grades K-5)
Stewart Creek Elementary (Grades K-5)

The district also participates in the Montgomery County JJAEP alternative education program, which is operated by Montgomery County in partnership with Conroe Independent School District.

At the May 17, 2016 Montgomery Independent School District Board of Trustees meeting, the following names were chosen for the new schools to be built using the bonds approved in 2015:
Lake Creek High School, 
Oak Hills Junior High School, 
Keenan Elementary School, and 
Lincoln Elementary School (formerly Montgomery Intermediate School)

Athletic facilities
There is a common athletic facility for the two high schools, Montgomery ISD Athletic Complex/Football Stadium. The scoreboard had a cost of $800,000.

Budget
In 2018, Montgomery ISD initiated a hiring freeze to prevent layoffs. Over the 2018-2019 academic year, the district experienced a budget shortfall of $6.9 million. The following 2019-2020 academic year, the District experienced another budget shortfall of $4.4 million.

References

External links
Montgomery ISD
Exciting Times as MISD’s New Schools Named

School districts in Montgomery County, Texas
1925 establishments in Texas
School districts established in 1925